S. Vetrivel is an Indian politician active in Tamil Nadu state. He is currently serving as a Member of Legislative Assembly (MLA) for Omalur in the Tamil Nadu Legislative Assembly. He is the member of the Anna Dravida Munnetra Kazhagam political party (AIADMK), led by Jayalalithaa.

Early life and education 
Vetrivel completed his schooling from Little flower School Salem, and he is also a B.A graduate from Sowdeswari College of Arts and Science.

He played for under-14 and 23 for the Tamil Nadu cricket team. He is also a member of Tamil Nadu cricket board selection committee and the Chennai cricket club.

Political career  
He is the member of the political party AIADMK from the year 1991. He was the chairman for Karuppur town panchayat from 2011 to 2015.
He contested as an AIADMK MLA candidate for Omalur constituency and won with the vote difference of 19,956 and became the member of Tamil Nadu legislative assembly.

References

All India Anna Dravida Munnetra Kazhagam politicians
Living people
Year of birth missing (living people)
Tamil Nadu MLAs 2016–2021